Stjepan Ivšić (13 August 1884 – 14 January 1962) was a Croatian linguist, Slavic specialist, and accentologist.

Biography
After finishing primary school in Orahovica, he attended secondary school in Osijek and Požega. At the Faculty of Philosophy at the University of Zagreb he studied Croatian and classical philology, and later specialized at the universities in Krakow, Prague, Saint Petersburg, Moscow, and Kiev. He received his PhD in 1913 with the thesis Prilog za slavenski akcenat (A Contribution on Slavic Accent). He served as a professor at the secondary school in Gornji Grad in Zagreb from 1909 to 1915, and thenceforth as a professor of Slavic Studies at the Faculty of Philosophy in Zagreb.

The focal point of Ivšić's research was Croatian Štokavian subdialects, on which he published several very important studies (Šaptinovačko narječje, 1907; Današnji posavski govor, 1913). He was especially interested in the accentuation of Croatian subdialects and Old Slavic grammars. He was the first to determine the existence of the neoacute in all three Croatian dialects.

In 1928 he participated in the efforts of state committee to create a common orthography for Croatian and Serbian. In the paper Jezik Hrvata kajkavaca (1936) he partitioned dialects of Kajkavian language  (not including the goranski subdialects ) into four major groups. He extensively studied Croatian Glagolitic heritage, especially its special language features, on which he published several works. In 1934 he tracked the Baška tablet from Krk to Zagreb and wrote an enthusiastic article about it called Sveta Lucija u Jurandvoru i njezin dragi kamen (Jutarnji list, 1934). In 1937 he became the vice president of the Croatian Language Society, and in 1938 the editor of the journal Hrvatski jezik (Croatian Language). He served as the chancellor of the University of Zagreb from 1939 to 1943. During the period of the Independent State of Croatia he refused an offer to serve as the head of the Croatian State Office for Language and advocated a phonology-based orthography as opposed to the official etymological-morphological one (known as korienski 'root').

Legacy
In the spring of 1945, due to alleged collaboration with the enemy, he was sentenced to exile from Zagreb and lost his membership in the Academy of Sciences and Arts. He was the only one to sign the conclusion of Novi Sad agreement, with the note "I give this signature with the remark that the statement in Act 4 of the conclusion cannot be used for promoting Ekavian pronunciation in the  present-day Ijekavian area."

A high school in Ivšić's native Orahovica bears his name.

Works
 Srpsko-hrvatski jezik. Izgovor i intonacija s recitacijama na pločama (with M. Kravar; Zagreb, 1955)
 Slavenska poredbena gramatika (prepared by R. Katičić and J. Vrana, Zagreb. 1970)
 Izabrana djela iz slavenske akcentuacije (prepared by B. Finka, Munich, 1971),
 Jezik Hrvata kajkavaca (prepared by J. Lisac, Zaprešić, 1996)

See also
 Ivšić's law

Notes

References
 

1884 births
1962 deaths
People from Orahovica
Linguists from Croatia
Slavists
Faculty of Humanities and Social Sciences, University of Zagreb alumni
Rectors of the University of Zagreb
Members of the Croatian Academy of Sciences and Arts
Burials at Mirogoj Cemetery
20th-century linguists